Yi Hocheol (15 March 1932 – 18 September 2016) was a South Korean writer who won several awards.

Life
Yi Hocheol was born on 15 March 1932 in Wonsan, Hamgyeongnam-do, North Korea, and lived through the tragedy of the ideological conflict in Korea. His father refused to cooperate with Northern communists, so his family had their property confiscated, and were chased out of their hometown. During the war Yi Hocheol was drafted into the North Korean army and sent to the front in the South. He eventually rejoined his family in his native town, but ultimately decided to move to South Korea by himself. A prolific writer as well as an activist, he participated in the pro-democracy movement against the dictatorial regime of President Park Chung-hee, and spent most of the 1970s in prison. In the 1980s, after the army general Chun Doo-hwan gained power through a coup d'état, Yi Hocheol continued to battle against the military dictatorship despite increasing government persecution, and became actively involved in organizations such as the Association of Writers for Literature of Freedom and Practice (Jayu silcheon munin hyeobuihoe). He died in September 2016 from a brain tumor at the age of 84.

Work
Yi Hocheol made his literary debut in 1955 with the story Leaving Home, and was known for directly confronting and describing reality. His early works explored the emotional toll of the Korean War on individuals and illuminated the conflict between those who benefited from the war and those ruined by it. National Division also became one of his themes and  “Panmunjeom” (Panmunjeom, 1961), a story of a South Korean reporter's visit to the DMZ and his brief but warm encounter with a female reporter from the North, is one of his most famous stories. "Northerners, Southerners" (Namnyeok salam bugnyeok salam), similarly, focused on issues of the split from the perspective of a young Korean soldier. Yi Hocheol was also interested in the effects of economic success, sometimes writing about the petite bourgeoisie's becoming hardened by hollow values and the pursuit of money.

Works in Translation
 Panmunjom
 Panmunjom and Other Stories
 Southerners, Northerners
 
 
 
 
 
 
 
 
 
 
 
 
 

Works in Korean (Partial)

Short Story Collections 
 The Statue of a Nude (Nasang, 1961)
 Big Mountain (Keun san, 1972)
 Wearing Thin (1975)
 The Heretic (1976)
 Death in 1970 (1970 nyeonui jugeum, 1977),
 The Sound of the Night Wind (Bam baram sori, 1980)
 The Gate (1981)
 People Who Crossed Over to the South (Wollamhan saramdeul, 1981)

Novels
 Petit Bourgeois (Sosimin, 1964)
 Seoul Is Full (Seoureun manwonida, 1966)
 Entertaining World (Jaemi inneun sesang, 1970)
 The Deep Valley of That Winter (1978)
 Northerners, Southerners (Namnyeok salam bugnyeok salam, 1996)

Awards
 Contemporary Literature (Hyundae Munhak) Award (1962)
 Dong-in Literary Award (1962)
 Korean Literature Award (1989)

References 

1932 births
2016 deaths
South Korean writers